Bernardo Maria Morais Cardoso Vital (born 29 December 2000) is a Portuguese professional footballer who plays for G.D. Estoril Praia as a central defender.

Club career
Born in Lisbon, Vital joined G.D. Estoril Praia's academy at the age of 14. He made his senior debut with the club in the Liga Portugal 2 on 20 September 2020, coming on as a late substitute for André Vidigal in a 1–0 away loss against Académica de Coimbra. He added three more appearances until the end of the season, in an eventual promotion as champions.

Vital played his first match in the Primeira Liga on 7 August 2021, starting and finishing the 2–0 win at F.C. Arouca. In December, as his contract was due to expire, he renewed it until 2025.

Vital scored his first goal in the Portuguese top division on 27 February 2022, opening an eventual 2–3 home defeat to Boavista FC.

International career
On 24 September 2022, Vital won his first cap for Portugal at under-21 level, playing the second half of the 4–1 friendly win over Georgia.

Honours
Estoril
Liga Portugal 2: 2020–21

References

External links

2000 births
Living people
Portuguese footballers
Footballers from Lisbon
Association football defenders
Primeira Liga players
Liga Portugal 2 players
G.D. Estoril Praia players
Portugal under-21 international footballers